AFFT is an initialism that may refer to:
Air Force Fitness Test
Americans For Fair Taxation